Khlong Khwang is one of the seven subdistricts (tambon) of Sai Noi District, in Nonthaburi Province, Thailand. The subdistrict is bounded by (clockwise from north) Rat Niyom, Lahan, Sai Noi and Khun Si subdistricts. In 2020 it had a total population of 6,880 people.

Administration

Central administration
The subdistrict is subdivided into 10 administrative villages (muban).

Local administration
The area of the subdistrict is shared by two local administrative organizations.
Sai Noi Subdistrict Municipality
Khlong Khwang Subdistrict Administrative Organization

References

External links
Website of Sai Noi Subdistrict Municipality
Website of Khlong Khwang Subdistrict Administrative Organization

Tambon of Nonthaburi province
Populated places in Nonthaburi province